Deccan College of Medical Science (DCMS) is a medical school situated in Hyderabad, India offering the courses MBBS, postgraduate degree / diploma and superspeciality courses. It has an approved intake of 150 MBBS seats annually.

The college is affiliated to the KNR University of Health Sciences, Warangal from the academic year 2016-17 onwards. It was earlier affiliated to Dr. N. T. R. University of Health Sciences, Vijayawada. It is recognized by the Medical Council of India. It follows the syllabus prescribed by the University for MBBS course as mandated by Medical Council of India. The management observes such rules, regulation or orders which are applicable to minority institution without violating the rights conferred under Article 30(1) of the constitution of India.

The management
Deccan College of Medical Sciences is established and administered by Muslim Minority Trust, i.e., Dar-us-salam Educational Trust under the provision of Article 30(1) of the constitution of India. Dar-us-Salam Educational Trust is an autonomous body with Asaduddin Owaisi as its chairman and Akbaruddin Owaisi as Managing Director.

The college is administered by the chief administrator Dr. (Colonel) G. K. N. Prasad. Dr. Ashfaq Hasan is the principal and also the Professor of the department of Respiratory Medicine.

Dar-us-Salam Educational Trust
Dar-us-Salam Educational Trust (DET) was established in 1974 as a self-financing minority institution under the chairmanship of Late Sultan Salahuddin Owaisi (ex Member of Parliament, India). After the death of Late Sultan Salahuddin Owaisi the trust is now headed by Asaduddin Owaisi.

The building
The college is situated at Nawab Lutf ud Daula Palace, Zafargarh, Kanchanbagh near Santoshnagar. Attached to the college there is a seven-storey hospital:
The college occupies an area of  built-in area with adjacent open space of approximate  for further expansion. It has an Indoor sports complex, cricket ground, basketball court.

The hospital building houses the Nursing and the Physiotherapy colleges. In the cellar of the hospital building, Department of Hospital Management, Deccan School of Management is located. Department of Hospital management offers Masters in Hospital management (M.H.M ), which is affiliated to Osmania University and approved by AICTE.

Library
The college has a central library in addition to departmental libraries. As of 2018, it contains over 30,000 textbooks and reference books; and 130 print journals subscribed in 2018.

Courses offered

Graduate degrees

Postgraduate diplomas

Postgraduate degrees

Superspeciality degrees

Alumni 
 Deccan Alumni Association
 Deccan Alumni Association of North America

See also
 List of Medical Schools in India
 Center For Stem Cell Science, Hyderabad

References

External links
 Deccan College of Medical Sciences - Official site

Medical colleges in Telangana
Universities and colleges in Hyderabad, India
1984 establishments in Andhra Pradesh
Educational institutions established in 1984